Myeongjong of Joseon (3 July 1534 – 3 August 1567, r. 1545–1567) was the 13th king of the Joseon Dynasty of Korea. He was the second son of Jungjong, and his mother was Queen Munjeong, who was Jungjong's third queen.

He became king in 1545 at the age of 12 following the death of his half-brother, Injong. Since he was too young to rule the kingdom, Queen Munjeong governed the nation in his name.

Biography

Political factions
There were two political factions at the time Myeongjong came to power; Greater Yun, headed by Yun Im, Injong's maternal uncle, and Lesser Yun, headed by Myeongjong's maternal uncles, Yun Won-hyeong and Yun Wonro. (Yun Im and Yun Brothers were close relatives by that period's standards - Yun Im was a third cousin once removed of Yun Brothers.)  Greater Yun took power in 1544, when Injong succeeded Jungjong; but they failed to wipe out their opposition, since Queen Munjeong protected the Lesser Yun faction and other opposition officials.

After the death of Injong in 1545, Lesser Yun replaced Greater Yun as the majority in the royal court and brutally ousted their adversaries in the Fourth Literati Purge of 1545. Yun Im was executed, as were many of his followers.

Rise of Yun Won-hyeong

The Lesser Yun faction continued to attack their opposition. In 1546, Yun Won-hyeong impeached his older brother, Yun Won-ro, who was executed a few days later along with his followers. Facing no opposition from the government, Yun Won-hyeong became Minister of Personnel 이조판서 in 1548, Left State Councilor in 1551 and ultimately Chief State Councilor 영의정  in 1563.

Despite Yun Won-hyeong's violent rule, Queen Munjeong was an effective administrator, distributing to the common people land formerly owned by the nobility. However, she held on to rule even after the king reached his majority at the age of 20.

Death of Queen Munjeong
After the death of Queen Munjeong in 1565, the king decided to rule the kingdom by himself and had his uncle Yun Won-hyeong put to death, along with his second wife Jeong Nan-jeong, who also rose to power due to her close friendship and being second sister-in-law to Queen Munjeong. Yun Won-hyeong allowed corruption to flourish in the government; while the kingdom was unstable, Jurchens, Japanese, and rebellious troops rampaged at will and threatened the government itself. Rebel leader Im Kkeok-jeong was arrested and executed in 1552, but outside invasion continued; the Joseon Dynasty had to re-mobilize its army and navy along to protect its borders.

Death and succession
Myeongjong tried to reform the government after taking power into his own hands by recalling and reinstating Sarim scholars who were exiled in the purge, but died only two years later without any male issue. King Seonjo, his half-nephew, succeeded to the throne in 1567.

Family
 Father: King Jungjong of Joseon (16 April 1488 – 29 November 1544) (조선 중종)
Grandfather: King Seongjong of Joseon (19 August 1457 – 20 January 1494) (조선 성종)
Grandmother: Queen Jeonghyeon of the Papyeong Yun clan (21 July 1462 – 13 September 1530) (정현왕후 윤씨)
 Mother: Queen Munjeong of the Papyeong Yun clan (2 December 1501 – 5 May 1565) (문정왕후 윤씨)
Grandfather: Yun Ji-Im (1475 – 14 April 1534) (윤지임)
Grandmother: Lady Lee of the Jeonui Lee clan (1475 – 1511) (전의 이씨)
 Consorts and their Respective Issue(s):
Queen Insun of the Cheongsong Shim clan (27 June 1532 – 12 February 1575) (인순왕후 심씨)
Yi Bu, Crown Prince Sunhoe (1 July 1551 – 6 October 1563) (이부 순회세자)  
Royal Noble Consort Gyeong of the Jeonui Lee clan (1541 – June 1595) (경빈 이씨)
Royal Noble Consort Sun of the Jeong clan (? – 1593) (순빈 정씨)
Royal Consort Gwi-in of the Geochang Shin clan (귀인 신씨)
Royal Consort So-ui of the Pyeongsan Shin clan (1533 – 1565) (소의 신씨)
Royal Consort Suk-ui of the Han clan (숙의 한씨) (? - 1594)
Royal Consort Suk-ui of the Onyang Jeong clan (숙의 정씨)
Royal Consort Suk-ui of the Dongrae Jeong clan (숙의 정씨)

Popular culture
 Portrayed by Seo Dong-hyun in the 2013 KBS2 TV series The Fugitive of Joseon.
 Portrayed by Lee David in the 2016 JTBC TV series Mirror of the Witch.
 Portrayed by Seo Ha-joon in the 2016 MBC TV series The Flower in Prison.

Notes

External links
 http://www.koreandb.net/Koreanking/html/person/pki60013.htm
 http://chosonsillok.org/inspection/insp_king.jsp?id=kma

1534 births
1567 deaths
16th-century Korean monarchs